In the field of bioengineering, biofunctionalisation (or biofunctionalization) is the modification of a material to have  biological function and/or stimulus, whether permanent or temporary, while at the same time being biologically compatible.

Various types of medical implants are designed to biofunctionalize so that they can replace or repair a defective biological function  and are accepted by the host organism.

References

Biotechnology